Novoye is a rural locality (a village) in Nikolskoye Rural Settlement, Kaduysky District, Vologda Oblast, Russia. The population was 68 as of 2002.

Geography 
Novoye is located 25 km north of Kaduy (the district's administrative centre) by road. Nikolskoye is the nearest rural locality.

References 

Rural localities in Kaduysky District